Manuel "Manu" Jorge Silva (born 12 June 2001) is a Portuguese professional footballer who plays as a defensive midfielder for the Primeira Liga club Vitória Guimarães.

Club career
Silva is a youth product of União de Lamas and Feirense. He was promoted to the senior Feirense side in the summer of 2020. He made his senior and professional debut with Feirense in a 2–0 Liga Portugal 2 loss to Sporting Covilha on 7 August 2021. On 24 May 2022, he renewed his contract with the club. After 28 appearances and 2 goals with Feirense, he transferred to Primeira Liga side Vitória Guimarães on 30 January 2023 until 2027.

Personal life
Manu's father, Jorge Silva, was a former footballer in Portugal.

References

External links
 

2001 births
Living people
Sportspeople from Santa Maria da Feira
Portuguese footballers
Association football midfielders
C.D. Feirense players
Vitória S.C. players
Primeira Liga players
Liga Portugal 2 players